The 2007 Football Northern Territory season in Northern Territory. The men's competitions consisted of two major divisions across the State.

League table

2007 North Zone Premier League
The season began on 22 April, concluding with the Grand Final on 23 September.

Finals series

2007 South Zone A Grade
The season began on 22 April, concluding with the Grand Final on 16 September.

Finals series

References

2007 in Australian soccer
Soccer in the Northern Territory